Castelletto Uzzone is a comune (municipality) in the Province of Cuneo in the Italian region Piedmont, located about  southeast of Turin and about  east of Cuneo. 
Castelletto Uzzone borders the following municipalities: Dego, Gottasecca, Levice, Pezzolo Valle Uzzone, Piana Crixia, and Prunetto.

References

Cities and towns in Piedmont